St Mary the Virgin is the parish church of Radnage in Buckinghamshire, situated towards the northeastern edge of the village. The church is part of the West Wycombe benefice, the building is Grade 1 listed.

History and construction 
The church was built in the late 12th Century, early 13th Century in much the same form as it appears today, though larger windows were inserted in the 14th century and the nave appears to have been lengthened and heightened in the 15th century, when the present roof was built. There is a central tower, which is unusual in being narrower than either the chancel or the nave.

There are three original lancet windows of the early 13th century in the east wall of the chancel. The other windows in the church are 14th century. The south doorway is original of the early 13th century. A similar north doorway has been blocked up. The south porch and outer door are original of the 13th century, but with a 15th-century roof and 15th-century windows in the side walls.

The fine 15th-century nave roof has embattled tie-beams supported by arched brackets with tracery in the spandrels and also in the triangular spaces above the beams. The lower-pitched chancel roof is probably 16th century.

Inside the church there is an archway through the tower with 13th-century arches in pointed style at either end. The chancel has a 13th-century piscina (damaged) in the south wall. The nave has traces of early wall painting and also post-Reformation texts (16th-to-18th-century). The font is probably 17th-century.

References

Grade I listed churches in Buckinghamshire
Churches in Buckinghamshire
Church of England church buildings in England